Tim Smolders (born 26 August 1980) is a Belgian former professional footballer who played as a midfielder for Club Brugge, RBC Roosendaal, Charleroi, K.A.A. Gent, and Cercle Brugge.

Coaching and later career
In his last year at Cercle Brugge, Smolders combined the roles of player and assistant manager. In August 2015, Smolders joined Belgian amateur club Zwevezele, and after three years at the club, he officially retired in August 2018, when he was hired as an assistant manager for the Belgian U-19 national team under manager Jacky Mathijssen.

In June 2019, Smolders returned to Club Brugge as an assistant coach for the clubs U-21 team and talent coach for both the U-21 and U-18 teams. On 9 August 2021, Smolders was placed in a new role at Club Brugge as the Head of the clubs Academy, Club NXT Academy. On May 31, 2022, Club announced that they and Smolders had mutually agreed to part ways.

Honours
Club Brugge
Belgian First Division A: 2002–03
Belgian Cup: 2001–02
Belgian Super Cup: 2002

References

External links
 

1980 births
Living people
Belgian footballers
Association football midfielders
Club Brugge KV players
R. Charleroi S.C. players
K.A.A. Gent players
RBC Roosendaal players
Cercle Brugge K.S.V. players
Belgian Pro League players
Belgian expatriate footballers
Belgian expatriate sportspeople in the Netherlands
Expatriate footballers in the Netherlands
K.S.K. Voorwaarts Zwevezele players
People from Geel
Footballers from Antwerp Province